, stylized as MAMESHiBA NO TAiGUN, is a Japanese alternative idol girl group formed through the reality survival show Monster Idol which featured on TBS Television's variety show Wednesday's Downtown in 2019. They debuted on December 19, 2019, with "Restart".

History
Mameshiba no Taigun was formed on December 18, 2019, through the final of TBS's reality survival show Monster Idol. While Hanae, Nao, Aika and Miyuki were contestants on the show, Hanae was also a member of WACK's trainee group Wagg. They released their debut single, "Restart", on December 19. A fifth member, Kaede, who was also a contestant on the show, was added to the group's line-up on December 25. 

On January 1, 2020, the members' stage names were revealed. The group's second single, "Rocket Start", and third single, "Daijōbu Sunrise", were released together on March 4.

The band were scheduled to release their debut studio album, Start, on May 13, 2020, however it was delayed to June 10 due to the COVID-19 pandemic. Running up to the release of the album the group released "Flash" and "Donkusa Happy" as digital singles. On August 5, it was announced that the group would make their major debut with the triple A side single, "AAA", under Avex Trax on October 7. On December 30, They became one of four recipients of the New Artist Award at the 62nd Japan Record Awards.

The band released their second studio album, Mamejor!, on January 20, 2021. They released their first EP, Wow!! Season, on July 14. Their second major single, "Kinō wa Modoranai / Koi no Full Swing", was released on December 22.

They released their third major single, "Mamen Joy / Machigai Darake no Hero", on July 20, 2022. On September 7, in the lead up to the release of their next single, "Must Change", the group launched the "Must Change Project" in which each member would have a solo edition of the CD single and whoever sold the most copies would receive a solo debut while whoever sold the least number of copies would have to re-audition for the group. On December 7, they released their fourth major single, "Must Change". On December 10, the winner of the "Must Change Project" was revealed to be Nao while the loser was revealed to be Aika, therefore Nao would get to debut as a soloist while Aika would have to take part in an audition camp.

From December 11 to 14, an audition camp with the aim of finding new members for the group was held. Initially, Aika was the only member who would take part in the camp due to her losing the "Must Change Project", but it was decided that all existing members of the group, excluding Kaede, would take part in the camp with their position in the line-up at risk. It was announced that the audition camp was being held due to the unprofessionalism of the group's members who had cancelled an upcoming job with little notice thus causing staff problems. The audition camp resulted in Nao and Aika being kicked out of the group but they were ultimately allowed to keep their positions. Kaede graduated from the group on December 17 at the We Must Change Tour Final where new members, Reona and Momoka, later known as Leona Empire and Momoti Ngale, who were recruited through the auditon camp joined the group. Both new members made their debut performance with the group on January 6, 2023. A re-recorded version of "Must Change", titled "Must Change -We Keep Changing-", without Kaede and featuring the new members was released on the same day.

They released their third studio album, Mamequest, on February 22, 2023.

Members

Current

Former

Discography

Studio albums

Extended plays

Singles

As lead artist

Collaborations

Awards and nominations

Notes

References

Japanese idol groups
Japanese pop music groups
Musical groups established in 2019
Musical groups from Tokyo
2019 establishments in Japan